Emma Martínez de la Torre Shelton (sometimes y Shelton) (15 January 1889 – 1980) was a Cuban-born pianist and composer long active in the Canary Islands.

Martínez was born in Havana, and moved with her family to Cádiz at the age of three. After lessons at that city's Santa Cecilia Academy and with Rafael Toniasi Requena in Madrid, she traveled to Rome for further work at the Accademia Nazionale di Santa Cecilia. She then settled in Tenerife, where she continued her studies with Santiago Sabina Corona. She worked as an accompanist to Néstor de la Torre between 1909 and 1917; she taught at the island's conservatory, and was otherwise heavily active in the musical life of the community as performer and concert organizer. As a composer Martínez was self-taught; most of her output dates to late in her career, and includes orchestral works as well as chamber music and songs.

References

1889 births
1980 deaths
People from Havana
People from Tenerife
Cuban emigrants to Spain
Accademia Nazionale di Santa Cecilia alumni
Musicians from the Canary Islands
Spanish women classical composers
Spanish classical composers
Spanish classical pianists
Spanish women pianists
Women classical pianists
20th-century Spanish musicians
20th-century classical composers
20th-century classical pianists
20th-century women composers
20th-century Spanish women
20th-century women pianists